Big Beach is an American independent production company founded in 2004 by Marc Turtletaub and Peter Saraf, based in New York City. It is best known for their lower-budget comedy-drama films, including the 2006 film Little Miss Sunshine.

History 

The company began when Turtletaub and Saraf co-produced the 2005 film Everything Is Illuminated. The new company then took over production duties on two films that had been developed by Turtletaub's previous production company, Deep River Studios: Duane Hopwood and Sherrybaby in 2005 and 2006.

In 2014, Big Beach launched a television division of the company that is headed by Robin Schwartz. In 2015, the company opened a Los Angeles-based office that is headquartered next to their subsidiary, Beachside.

In June of 2022, Big Beach announced a number of new projects including the upcoming films Tropical Gothic and Out of My Mind. In February, 2022, Big Beach moved its headquarters to their Los Angeles-based offices and laid off a number of New York-based staff. This came after Saraf had already "quietly" left Big Beach in 2021.

Filmography

Films 
Big Beach has produced or co-produced the following films:

Television

Theatre

References

External links
 Big Beach website

Film production companies of the United States
American companies established in 2004
Mass media companies established in 2004
Mass media companies based in New York City
American independent film studios